John Murphy (born 26 August 1937) was a member of the House of Commons of Canada from 1993 to 1997.

Born in Halifax, Nova Scotia, Murphy became a Liberal party candidate for the Annapolis Valley—Hants electoral district in the 1988 federal election. He lost to Progressive Conservative candidate Pat Nowlan.

His second attempt for the riding succeeded in 1993 as he defeated incumbent Nowlan (now an independent) and new Progressive Conservative candidate Jim White. In the 1997 federal election, Murphy would campaign in the riding now restructured as Kings—Hants, only to be defeated by Progressive Conservative candidate Scott Brison. Murphy has not attempted to return to Parliament since his term in the 35th Canadian Parliament.

References 

 

1937 births
Canadian people of Irish descent
Liberal Party of Canada MPs
Living people
Members of the House of Commons of Canada from Nova Scotia
People from Halifax, Nova Scotia